James Lott (born October 13, 1965) is a retired football player and American high jumper. .

He finished tenth at the 1987 World Indoor Championships and won the gold medal at the 1987 World Summer Universiade Games.

His personal best jump is 2.34 metres, achieved in May 1987 in Austin.  In 1983, while competing for Refugio High School in Refugio, Texas, Lott set the National High school and World Junior Record in the high jump at 7' 4¾" improving on the 4-year-old record by Lee Balkin.  The following year, Lott's record was improved upon by Dothel Edwards from Cedar Shoals High School in Athens, Georgia which lasted 25 years.  Lott is still number 3 on the all-time list behind Edwards and the current record holder James White from Grandview High School in Grandview, MissouriLott won 3 NCAA High Jump Titles  and 6 SWC Indoor and outdoor titles at The University of Texas.

Lott also enjoyed an extensive Football career at The University of Texas.  Lott started for the Longhorns in 1984 and 1985 at Cornerback.  He was inducted into the Texas HS Football Hall of Fame in 1994, and is a Member of the SWC All Decade Team.

References 
 

1965 births
Living people
American male high jumpers
Maryland Commandos players
Pittsburgh Gladiators players
Universiade medalists in athletics (track and field)
People from Refugio, Texas
Universiade gold medalists for the United States
Texas Longhorns men's track and field athletes
Medalists at the 1987 Summer Universiade